Ambivli railway station is a railway station on the Central line of the Mumbai Suburban Railway network, in western India. It is located on the route between Kalyan and Kasara. Shahad is the previous stop and Titwala is the next stop.

Trains 
Some of the trains that run from Ambivli are:

Only local trains run on this station with frequency of approximately 75 pairs of trains for up and down which includes 2 pair of AC local from Titwala to CSMT.

References

Railway stations in Thane district
Mumbai Suburban Railway stations
Mumbai CR railway division
Transport in Kalyan-Dombivli
Kalyan-Igatpuri rail line